Yermek Shinarbayev (also translated as Ermek Shinarbaev) is a Soviet film director. Born in 1953 in Alma-Ata, Soviet Union (now Almaty, Kazakhstan), Shinarbaev is sometimes categorized as a member of the Kazakh New Wave. He is especially well known for his collaboration with the Korean-Russian writer, Anatoli Kim, resulting to three films. The last of Shinarbaev-Kim film Mest (Revenge), was screened in the Un Certain Regard section at the 1991 Cannes Film Festival and won the grand prize at Sochi Open Russian Film Festival in 1990.

Filmography
 Sestra moya, Lyusya (My Sister Lucy) (1985) (script by Anatoli Kim)
 Vyyti iz lesa na polyanu (Out of the Forest, into the Glade) (1987) (script by Anatoli Kim)
 Mest (Revenge) (1989) (script by Anatoli Kim)
 Azghyin ushtykzyn'azaby (1993)
 Alciz Shurek (1994)

References

External links

1953 births
Living people
Soviet film directors
Kazakhstani film directors